Haste is the eponymous debut album by the free improvisation trio consisting of British pianist Veryan Weston, German saxophonist Ingrid Laubrock and British cellist Hannah Marshall. It was recorded live in 2011 during the XV Festival Internacional de Improvisacion Hurta Cordel in Barcelona and released on the British Emanem label.

Reception
The All About Jazz review by Raul D'Gama Rose states, "Together, these three musicians have created an ingenious document where past and present collide revealing a glimpse what might be in a not-so- imaginary future."

The Point of Departure review by Stuart Broomer says, "It’s work (for musician and listener alike) that consistently surprises, whether it’s Laubrock’s articulation (like a gentle machine gun), Weston’s at once billowing and blistering keyboard passes, or Marshall’s eerily evasive knitwork that simultaneously links and dissolves the myriad connections in the music. It’s free improvisation of rare consonance."

Track listing
All compositions by Weston,Laubrock,Marshall
 "Sleping Down Hill" – 27:11
 "Leaning Up"  – 23:16
 "Courtesy of None" – 5:44

Personnel
Veryan Weston – piano
Ingrid Laubrock – soprano sax, tenor sax
Hannah Marshall – cello

References

2012 live albums
Veryan Weston albums
Ingrid Laubrock live albums
Emanem Records albums